Mike Gore (July 6, 1878 – August 16, 1953) was a movie theater owner who received a star on the Hollywood Walk of Fame for his work in Motion pictures.

Gore came to the United States from the Russian Empire as a child, settling first in Chicago where he later was in the cigar-manufacturing business. He came to Los Angeles in 1906, when the movie industry was in its early days. He was a co-founder of the West Coast Theatres chain of first-run movie theaters in 1920.

References

1878 births
1953 deaths
Emigrants from the Russian Empire to the United States
Businesspeople from California
Place of birth missing